Twice Upon a Time is a 1953 British comedy film directed by Emeric Pressburger and starring Hugh Williams, Elizabeth Allan, Yolande Larthe, and Charmian Larthe. It is based on the 1949 novel Lisa and Lottie by Erich Kästner. It concerns twin sisters who are separated when their parents divorce. They meet again by accident when they are sent to the same summer camp, and they hatch a plan to reunite their parents.

Lotte and Lisa had already been adapted into the films Two Times Lotte (1950) and Hibari no komoriuta (1951).  Twice Upon a Time was the first English-language film adaptation; the story was later adapted as The Parent Trap (1961) and has been remade a number of times in English and many other languages. It was shot at Shepperton Studios with sets designed by the art director Arthur Lawson (designer).

The film is the only solo directing credit for Pressburger, whose other directing credits are in association with Michael Powell.

Cast
 Hugh Williams as James Turner
 Elizabeth Allan as Carol-Anne Bailey
 Jack Hawkins as Dr. Mathews
 Yolande Larthe as Carol Turner
 Charmian Larthe as Anne Bailey
 Violette Elvin as Florence la Riche
 Isabel Dean as Miss Burke
 Michael Gough as Mr. Lloyd
 Walter Fitzgerald as Professor Reynolds
 Jeanne Stuart as Mrs. Jamieson
 Nora Gordon as Emma
 Martin Miller as Eipeldauer
 Lily Kann as Mrs. Eipeldauer
 Collin Wilcox as Ian
 Jack Lambert as Ernest 
 Pat Baker as Sonia
 	Isabel George as Molly
 Alanna Boyce as 	Susie
 	Margaret McCourt as Wendy
 Myrette Morven	as 	Miss Rupert
 Margaret Boyd as 	Mrs. Kinnaird
 Cicely Walper as 	Mrs. Maybridge
 	Mollie Terraine as 	Miss Wellington 
 Archie Duncan as Doorman

References

Bibliography
 Goble, Alan. The Complete Index to Literary Sources in Film. Walter de Gruyter, 1999.

External links

1953 films
1953 comedy films
British comedy films
British remakes of German films
1953 directorial debut films
Films based on Lottie and Lisa
Love stories
Films about summer camps
British black-and-white films
British Lion Films films
London Films films
Films shot at Shepperton Studios
1950s English-language films
1950s British films